Phragmipedium hirtzii is a species of orchid endemic to northern Ecuador.

References

External links 

hirtzii
Endemic orchids of Ecuador